Baron Wilhelm Carl von Rothschild (Hebrew: שמעון וואלף רוטשילט; May 16, 1828 – 25 January 1901) was a banker and financier of the Frankfurt House of Rothschild.

Life and career 
Wilhelm Carl von Rothschild was the son of Baron Carl Mayer von Rothschild of Naples and Adelheid Hertz. He was known by some as "The Tzadik of the Rothschild House." He strongly supported many Orthodox Jewish institutions and studied in Yeshivas. He married his cousin Mathilde Hannah von Rothschild, the second oldest daughter of Anselm von Rothschild, a chief of the Vienna House of Rothschilds in 1849. The couple first resided in the Rothschild house on the Zeil (Zeilpalast), but later moved to a palace in Grüneburg, and also lived in a villa in Königstein im Taunus. They had three daughters, two of which survived to adulthood. Adelheid von Rothschild married her cousin Edmond James de Rothschild, while her younger sister Minna Caroline Rothschild married Maximilian Goldschmidt, who adopted the name "Goldschmidt-Rothschild" after Wilhelm Carl's death in 1901.

In 1855 von Rothschild became joint head with his brother Mayer Karl of the Frankfurt house. When his brother died in 1886, he became sole head. As he and his brother left no male heirs, the Frankfurt house was discontinued at his death.

Von Rothschild, who was religious his entire life, was eulogized by Eliyahu David Rabinowitz-Teomim at the Yeshivas Knesses Beis Yitzchak-Kaminetz in Kaunas as הצדיק השר הטפסר (the righteous, the nobleman, the aristocracy).

See also 
 Rothschild banking family of Austria
 Rothschild banking family of England
 Rothschild banking family of France
 Rothschild banking family of Naples

References

Sources
 The Rothschilds; a Family Portrait by Frederic Morton. Atheneum Publishers (1962)  (1998 reprint)
 The Rothschilds, a Family of Fortune by Virginia Cowles. Alfred A. Knopf (1973)  
 Rothschild: The Wealth and Power of a Dynasty by Derek Wilson. Scribner, London (1988) 
 House of Rothschild : Money's Prophets: 1798-1848 by Niall Ferguson. Viking Press (1998) 
 The House of Rothschild (vol. 2) : The World's Banker: 1849-1999 by Niall Ferguson. Viking Press (1999)

External links 

 The Rothschild Archive - an international cente in London for research into the history of the Rothschild family.

1828 births
1901 deaths
Wilhelm Carl
19th-century German Jews
German bankers
Burials at the Old Jewish Cemetery, Frankfurt